The following lists events that happened during 2015 in Tonga.

Incumbents
Monarch: Tupou VI
Prime Minister: ʻAkilisi Pōhiva

Events

January
 January 12 - The eruption of the Hunga Tonga volcano disrupts flights to and from Tonga.
 January 16 - The explosion of the Hunga Tonga submerged volcano near Tonga creates a new island.

References

 
2010s in Tonga
Years of the 21st century in Tonga
Tonga
Tonga